Amos Thomas (March 30, 1826 – ?) was an American farmer and politician.

Born in Daviess County, Indiana, Thomas moved to (polecat hollow)in 1839 and settled in the town of Granville in the community of Good Hope. He was a farmer. Thomas served on the Milwaukee County, Wisconsin Board of Supervisors and was the chairman. In 1889, Thomas served in the Wisconsin State Assembly as a Republican.

Notes

1826 births
Year of death unknown
People from Daviess County, Indiana
People from Granville, Wisconsin
County supervisors in Wisconsin
Republican Party members of the Wisconsin State Assembly